The Federal Service for Technical and Export Control of Russia (FSTEC of Russia / FSTEK) is a military agency of the Russian Federation, under the Russian Ministry of Defence. It licenses the export of weapons and dual-use technology items, and is also responsible for Russian military information security.

FSTEC of Russia maintains the Data Security Threats Database, Russia's national vulnerability database. and requires Western technology companies to submit source code and other trade secrets before allowing their products to be imported into Russia. FSTEC also liaises with the FSB, which controls cryptography in Russia.

In 2019, FSTEC of Russia granted Astra Linux special status regarding its use in processing Russian classified information.

References 

Ministry of Defence (Russia)
Computer security organizations